Ganya may refer to:
Francis Chachu Ganya, Kenyan politician
Ganya, a diminutive of the Russian male first name Agap
Ganya, a diminutive of the Russian female first name Agapiya

See also
Ganja (disambiguation)